Jennifer Carole Ledger (born 8 December 1989) is an English singer, drummer and co-vocalist for the American Christian rock band Skillet. At the age of 18, she became Skillet's drummer when Lori Peters retired.

Ledger released a solo EP in 2018 under the name Ledger. Several songs hit the Christian Rock chart and several other songs hit the Contemporary Christian music chart.

Early life
Ledger was born in Coventry and started playing the drums when she was 13. Ledger attended Coventry Blue Coat Church of England School where she passed her GCSEs. She played drums in a local band and was a finalist for the United Kingdom Drummer of the Year competition in 2006.

She relocated to the United States at age 16 to major in drums with a scholarship at Living Light School of Worship in Kenosha, Wisconsin. She joined the band The Spark; since the band already had a drummer, she played bass.

Musical career

With Skillet

Band members from Skillet discovered Ledger when they attended church services in the United States, where she was living at the time, and asked Ledger to audition for an open drummer spot in the band. She has been Skillet's drummer and female vocalist since 2008, beginning with their promotional tour for the album Comatose.

Solo 
Ledger stated that she and bandmate Korey Cooper began to write music for her own pop-influenced solo-project album in about 2012.

In March 2018, it was announced that her debut EP, Ledger, was scheduled to be released on 13 April. She has signed a deal with Atlantic Records and Hear it Loud, the imprint launched by Skillet's John and Korey Cooper and manager Zachary Kelm. Ledger was produced by Korey Cooper along with writer and producer Seth Mosley. Ledger was named the opening act for Skillet's Unleashed tour. On 6 April, she released an official audio for the song "Not Dead Yet" on YouTube. In a 2018 Billboard article, Deborah Evans Price stated that “Ledger wrote “Not Dead Yet” about a difficult time in her life when she was badly struggling with anxiety, fear and panic attacks.”

On 8 October 2018, it was announced that Ledger would be performing at the 2019 Winter Jam Tour Spectacular, along with Newsboys, Danny Gokey, Mandisa and Rend Collective.

On 15 February 2019, Ledger released her non-album single, "Completely," followed by a music video published on 27 March.

On 14 February 2020, Ledger released her second non-album single, "My Arms", which was accompanied by a lyric video the same day.

Personal life 

Ledger became a US citizen on 1 April 2021.

Discography

With Skillet

 Awake (2009)
 Rise (2013)
 Unleashed (2016)
 Victorious (2019)
 Dominion (2022)

As Ledger

Extended plays

Singles

Music videos

As featured artist

 The Elements – "Neon Feather" remix – TobyMac featuring Ledger

Awards

Notes

References

External links

1989 births
Living people
English heavy metal drummers
English heavy metal singers
British women drummers
21st-century English women singers
21st-century English singers
21st-century drummers
English rock drummers
English rock singers
Women heavy metal singers
Skillet (band) members
English Christians
Musicians from Coventry
Naturalized citizens of the United States